Park Jun-hui (born 1 March 1991) is a South Korean footballer who plays as a midfielder.

Career
He was selected by Pohang Steelers in the 2014 K League draft.

References

External links 

1991 births
Living people
Konkuk University alumni
Association football midfielders
South Korean footballers
Pohang Steelers players
Ansan Greeners FC players
Gwangju FC players
Bucheon FC 1995 players
K League 1 players
K League 2 players